Irtyubyak (İrtöbäk) is a rural locality (a village) in Ibrayevsky Selsoviet, Kugarchinsky District, Bashkortostan, Russia. The population was 70 as of 2010. There is 1 street.

Geography 
Irtyubyak is located 14 km west of Mrakovo (the district's administrative centre) by road. Urakayevo is the nearest rural locality.

References 

Rural localities in Kugarchinsky District